Oakland is a census-designated place (CDP) in Stonycreek Township, Cambria County, Pennsylvania, United States. It is bordered on the west by the city of Johnstown and on the south by the boroughs of Lorain and Geistown. As of the 2010 census, the population of Oakland was 1,578.

Demographics

References

Census-designated places in Cambria County, Pennsylvania